Mormonda was a town of ancient Ionia. Its site is located close to Izmir (ancient Smyrna), Asiatic Turkey.

References

Populated places in ancient Ionia
Former populated places in Turkey